The women's eights rowing competition at the 1980 Summer Olympics took place at Krylatskoye Sports Complex Canoeing and Rowing Basin, Moscow, Soviet Union. The event was held from 21 to 26 July.

Heats 
The fastest team in each heat advanced to the final. The remaining teams must compete in repechage for the remaining spots in the final.

Heat 1

Heat 2

Repechage 
Three fastest teams in the repechage advanced to the final.

Final

References

Sources

Rowing at the 1980 Summer Olympics
Women's rowing at the 1980 Summer Olympics